Blinkers may refer to:

Turn signals in automotive lighting
Blinkers, alternate term for blinders on the bridle of a horse harness or race horse hood
 Blinkers, alternate term for the smoke deflectors on a steam locomotive